Belle of Old Mexico is a 1950 American Trucolor comedy film directed by Robert G. Springsteen starring Estelita Rodriguez, Robert Rockwell and Dorothy Patrick. The film was successful at the box office, impressing the bosses at Republic Pictures who believed that Rodriguez could be turned into a star similar to Lupe Vélez.

Synopsis
An American World War II veteran, fulfills a promise he made to one of his dying comrades by going to Mexico to adopt his daughter. When he gets there, she turns out to not to be the little girl he had imagined but an attractive young woman. He has extreme difficulty convincing his fiancée and employers that their relationship is entirely innocent.

Cast
 Estelita Rodriguez as Rosita Dominguez 
 Robert Rockwell as Kip Armitage III 
 Dorothy Patrick as Deborah Chatfield 
 Thurston Hall as Horatio Huntington 
 Florence Bates as Nellie Chatfield 
 Dave Willock as Tommy Mayberry 
 Gordon Jones as Tex Barnet 
 Fritz Feld as Doctor Quincy 
 Anne O'Neal as Mrs. Abercrombie 
 Nacho Galindo as Pico 
 Joe Venuti as Joe Venuti 
 Edward Gargan as Sam 
 Carlos Molina and his Orchestra - Themselves

References

Bibliography
 Rainey, Buck. Sweethearts of the Sage: Biographies and Filmographies of 258 actresses appearing in Western movies. McFarland & Company, 1992.

External links

1950 films
American musical comedy films
1950 musical comedy films
Films directed by R. G. Springsteen
Republic Pictures films
Films set in Mexico
Trucolor films
1950s English-language films
1950s American films